Diabolique may refer to:

Diabolique (1955 film), or Les Diaboliques, 1955 French film starring Simone Signoret
Diabolique (1996 film), 1996 United States remake of Les Diaboliques starring Sharon Stone
Diabolique (band), a Swedish gothic metal band
Diabolique (porn star)

See also
 Diabolik, Italian comic character